"Walking in My Blue Jeans" is a song by American singer-songwriter Sophie B. Hawkins, which was released in 2001 as the second and final single from her third studio album Timbre. The song was written and produced by Hawkins. "Walking in My Blue Jeans" peaked at number 23 on the US Billboard Adult Contemporary chart.

Background
"Walking in My Blue Jeans" originally appeared as "Strange Thing", the opening track on Hawkins' third album Timbre, which was released by Columbia in 1999. At the time, the relationship between Hawkins and the label was strained owing to disagreements over Hawkins' musical direction and image. When the album and its promotional single "Lose Your Way" failed to meet commercial expectations, Hawkins left Columbia in 2000. After buying back the rights to the album, Hawkins had Timbre re-released independently on her own Trumpet Swan Records and under a distribution agreement with Rykodisc in 2001. To promote the re-release, "Walking in My Blue Jeans" was issued as a promotional single. The song was also used that year by Calvin Klein to promote its latest line of women's jeans.

Speaking to the Gavin Report in 2001, Hawkins said of the song,

Critical reception
In a review of the original release of Timbre, Sandra Sperounes of The Edmonton Journal described the song as a "mid-tempo number featuring Hawkins' yearning voice, ghostly xylophones and a lonely guitar riff". In a review of the 2001 re-release of Timbre, Kim Curtis of the Associated Press wrote, "With its infectious optimism and catchy kettle drum chorus, the song is poised to become Hawkins' latest hit." On its release as a single, Todd Spencer of the Gavin Report described "Walking in My Blue Jeans" as a "made-for-summer record, with a languid melody and a breezy, open-tuned marimba that gives it a stone-washed 'relaxed fit' on Mainstream A/Cs across the country."

Track listing
CD single (US promo)
"Walking in My Blue Jeans" – 3:53
"Lose Your Way" – 4:03

CD single (European promo)
"Walking in My Blue Jeans" (Radio Edit) – 2:52

Personnel
Production
 Sophie B. Hawkins – producer, engineer
 Kevin Killen – mixing, engineer
 Chris Fuderich, Al Sanderson – assistant engineers
 Bob Ludwig – mastering

Other
 Gigi Gaston – photography

Charts

References

1999 songs
2001 singles
Sophie B. Hawkins songs
Songs written by Sophie B. Hawkins
Rykodisc singles